Paw Paw Lake is an unincorporated community in Berrien County in the U.S. state of Michigan. It is a census-designated place (CDP) for statistical purposes, without legal status as a municipality. The community is located within areas of both Coloma Charter Township and Watervliet Township in the area surrounding Paw Paw Lake and Little Paw Paw Lake, excluding the cities of Watervliet and Coloma. The population of the CDP was 3,511 at the 2010 census.

Geography
The Paw Paw River, outlet of the lakes, forms most of the southern boundary of the CDP. North Coloma Road forms the western edge of the CDP, Hagar Shore Road the north edge, and highway M-140 the eastern edge. The cities of Watervliet and Coloma touch the CDP at its southeast and southwest corners, respectively.

Demographics

As of the census of 2000, there were 3,944 people, 1,655 households, and 1,128 families residing in the CDP. The racial makeup of the CDP was 96.63% White, 0.58% Black or African American, 0.51% Native American, 0.68% Asian, 0.05% Pacific Islander, 0.20% from other races, and 1.34% from two or more races. Hispanic or Latino of any race were 1.37% of the population.

There were 1,655 households, out of which 27.2% had children under the age of 18 living with them, 54.3% were married couples living together, 11.1% had a female householder with no husband present, and 31.8% were non-families. 27.7% of all households were made up of individuals, and 11.5% had someone living alone who was 65 years of age or older.  The average household size was 2.34 and the average family size was 2.83.

In the CDP, the population was spread out, with 22.4% under the age of 18, 7.0% from 18 to 24, 27.3% from 25 to 44, 27.1% from 45 to 64, and 16.2% who were 65 years of age or older.  The median age was 40 years. For every 100 females, there were 95.7 males.  For every 100 females age 18 and over, there were 93.4 males.

The median income for a household in the CDP was $38,216, and the median income for a family was $42,377. Males had a median income of $35,112 versus $20,833 for females. The per capita income for the CDP was $21,003.  About 5.2% of families and 6.6% of the population were below the poverty line, including 9.5% of those under age 18 and 5.3% of those age 65 or over.

History

The area which became the CDP was the site of a tourist area in the early 20th century. An 1894 Chicago newspaper article was the catalyst in making the shore a resort area, and a rail line extension from nearby Coloma in 1896 started the building boom. Pavilions, hotels, and cottages soon followed, with nationally known acts performing at the pavilions. Most of these buildings are no longer extant.

Deer Forest

The nearby Deer Forest animal park in Coloma Township opened at the end of the heyday of the resort area. Though many of its assets were auctioned off on September 26, 2009, the park continued to operate through the 2014 season. It closed permanently at the end of that season and animals were dispersed to various other locations. The property itself was auctioned off on June 29, 2015. It was auctioned again in 2021 and sold in March 2022.

References

Further reading

Unincorporated communities in Berrien County, Michigan
Census-designated places in Michigan
Unincorporated communities in Michigan
Census-designated places in Berrien County, Michigan
Defunct resorts